The Baltimore and Washington Transit Company was incorporated in Maryland in the 1890s to build an interurban between Baltimore and Washington, and was authorized to enter Washington to a junction with the Brightwood Railway on June 8, 1896. The Brightwood's branch to Takoma ran from its main line on Georgia Avenue east on Butternut Street to Fourth Street Northwest, where the B&W began, running via Fourth Street, Aspen Street, and Laurel Street, and to the Glen Sligo Hotel and Wildwood Resort in Maryland via Carroll Avenue, Ethan Allen Avenue, and Elm Avenue. Transfers were given between the Brightwood and the B&W.

An extension southwest along Third Street Northwest and Kennedy Street to the end of Capital Traction's Fourteenth Street Line at Colorado Avenue was authorized on May 29, 1908. On March 4, 1914, the Maryland General Assembly changed the name to the Washington and Maryland Railway, and on May 2, 1918, it was leased by Capital Traction as the Washington and Maryland Line.

References

Street railways in Washington, D.C.
Defunct Washington, D.C., railroads